The U.S. state of Utah has 27 official symbols, as designated by the Utah State Legislature, and three unofficial symbols.  All official symbols, except the Great Seal, are listed in Title 63G of Utah Code.  In 1896, Utah became a state, and on April 3 the Utah legislature, in its first regular session, adopted its first symbol, the Great Seal of the State of Utah.

Many unique symbols of Utah are related to Utah's pioneer heritage, such as the California gull, the beehive, the dutch oven and the Sego Lily.  Utah has symbols that are used by multiple states.  For example, the honey bee, Utah's state insect, is also a symbol of Arkansas, Georgia, Kansas, Louisiana, Maine, Mississippi, Missouri, Nebraska, New Jersey, North Carolina, West Virginia and Wisconsin.

Official State symbols

Unofficial State symbols

See also
 Symbolism in The Church of Jesus Christ of Latter-day Saints

References

General

Specific

Utah
 
State symbols